Compass Resources NL is an Australian mining and mineral exploration company listed on the Australian Stock Exchange and currently in voluntary administration since 29 January 2009.

The company's main assets are mineral resources at Browns, Browns East and Mount Fitch, adjacent to the former Rum Jungle uranium mine in the Northern Territory of Australia. Brown's consists of a multi-metal oxide deposit overlying a related sulphide deposit. Compass also has exploration rights over the site of the former uranium mine and some royalty rights on a gold mine in New South Wales.

Mining in the Northern Territory

On 29 January 2009, Compass Resources went into voluntary administration, while in the process of commissioning the Brown's Oxide mine.
Compass was listed on the ASX with the fourth-largest lead deposit in the world, plus numerous other deposits with the potential value in excess of $15 billion. The company was chaired by mining magnate Gordon Toll. The company was awarded major project facilitation status by the Australian federal government and endorsed as a "Major Project of National Significance". The company formed a joint venture with Hunan Non-Ferrous Metals Corporation . As Compass undertook capital projects to develop and extract lead and other metal ores, costs appear to have blown out.

References

External links

Mining companies of Australia
Uranium mining companies of Australia
Nickel mining companies